Sherwood Park is a large hamlet in Alberta, Canada.

Sherwood Park may also refer to:

Australia
Sherwood Park railway station, Victoria

Canada
Sherwood Park (electoral district)
Sherwood Park (Toronto park), a park in Toronto
Sherwood Park Crusaders, an ice hockey team
Sherwood Park Titans, a lacrosse team
Edmonton—Sherwood Park, an electoral district

England
 Sherwood Park, part of Royal Tunbridge Wells, in Kent

United States
 Sherwood Park (Richmond, Virginia), a neighborhood in Richmond, Virginia
 Sherwood Anderson Park, in Clyde, Ohio
 A park in Salinas, California

See also